XM25 can be:
XM25 CDTE, a grenade launcher with computerized air burst rounds
XM25 Sniper Rifle